Luv Ranjan is an Indian film director, writer and producer who works in Hindi cinema and owns Luv Films. His notable films include the romantic comedies Pyaar Ka Punchnama (2011), Pyaar Ka Punchnama 2 (2015), Sonu Ke Titu Ki Sweety (2018) and De De Pyaar De (2019).

Early life
After finishing his schooling from St. Paul's Academy, Ghaziabad, he studied at the Hindu College, Delhi University.

Career

Directing
He began his career as a director in 2011 with the film, Pyaar Ka Punchnama produced by Abhishek Pathak, Panorama Studios and Viacom18 Motion Pictures. The film is a romantic comedy which depicts the life of three young bachelors. In 2013, he wrote and directed Akaash Vani. Two years later, in 2015, he co-wrote and directed the sequel of Pyaar Ka Punchnama, Pyaar Ka Punchnama 2. The sequel too received much appreciation and performed well at the box office. He directed the film Sonu Ke Titu Ki Sweety in 2018. The film performed exceedingly well at the box office, although it holds a 40% rating on Rotten Tomatoes, based on 10 reviews. All four of his directorial ventures starred Kartik Aaryan and Nushrat Bharucha in lead roles.

In December 2019, it was announced that Ranjan will direct a romantic-comedy, titled Tu Jhoothi Main Makkaar starring Ranbir Kapoor and Shraddha Kapoor in the lead roles. It went on floors in January 2021 and was released on 8 March 2023, coinciding with the Holi.

Producing
He turned to production in 2012 with his childhood friend and co-producer, Ankur Garg, and founded their company, Luv Films. In 2016, he produced Life Sahi Hai, an Indian coming-of-age comedy web-series created by Tarun Jain. He directed and co-produced the comedy film, Sonu Ke Titu Ki Sweety, along with Ankur Garg and in collaboration with T-Series. It starred Kartik Aaryan, Nushrat Bharucha, and Sunny Singh in the lead roles. It emerged as a major commercial success and ranked as one of the highest-grossing Bollywood films of 2018. He next produced the urban romcom, De De Pyaar De, starring Ajay Devgn, Tabu, and Rakul Preet Singh. It was directed by his longtime editor, Akiv Ali.

Filmography

References

External links
 

Living people
Hindi-language film directors
Hindi screenwriters
Hindi film producers
1982 births